Bennie Jean Porter (December 8, 1922 – January 13, 2018) was an American film and television actress. She was notable for her roles in The Youngest Profession (1943), Bathing Beauty (1944), Abbott and Costello in Hollywood (1945), Till the End of Time (1946), Cry Danger (1951), and The Left Hand of God (1955).

Porter was married to Edward Dmytryk, who was one of the Hollywood Ten, the most prominent blacklisted group in the film industry during the McCarthy era.

Early life
Porter was born in Cisco, Texas, to a Texas and Pacific Railway worker and a music teacher. As a baby, she was called the "Most Beautiful Baby" in Eastland County. At 10 years old, she hosted a half-hour radio show on Saturday mornings on the WRR station in Dallas, Texas. She also spent a summer working for Ted Lewis's Vaudeville Band.

Career
At the age of 12, in 1935, Porter arrived in Hollywood and took dancing lessons at the Fanchon and Marco dancing school, where she was discovered by director Allan Dwan. Porter acted in Dwan's 1936 musical Song and Dance Man, but did not appear in the credits.

Beginning with a small roles in movies such as The Adventures of Tom Sawyer (1938) and One Million B.C. (1940), she eventually established herself as an actress for Metro-Goldwyn-Mayer in 1941.

While never a big star, she was active as a wholesome, mainly comedic, ingenue in B pictures throughout the 1940s, appearing in almost 30 motion pictures alongside MGM stars such as Esther Williams, Mickey Rooney, Margaret Dumont and the comedy duo Abbott and Costello.

In the 1950s, Porter appeared regularly on television in series such as The Red Skelton Show and The Abbott and Costello Show.  Her final TV roles were on Sea Hunt,  and 77 Sunset Strip. She would again be directed by Dmytryk in 1955's The Left Hand of God, before she retired from acting in 1961.

Personal life
Two years after he directed her as a loan replacement to RKO for Shirley Temple in Till the End of Time, aged 25, she married film director and writer Edward Dmytryk on May 12, 1948, in Ellicott City, Maryland.  It was his second marriage, her first. As Dmytryk was looking at a jail sentence for a contempt of Congress charge, fired from RKO and barred from working in the U.S., the couple moved to England, where she gave birth to the first of their three children. After they were forced to return to the U.S. in 1950 due to his expiring passport, Dmytryk was imprisoned for 6 months on the contempt charge. Porter now found herself in extreme difficulties as she had no career and no money to support her family. Dick Powell came to her aid by securing her a role in Cry Danger.

Porter was the author of the unpublished book The Cost of Living, about her life with Dmytryk. She also wrote Chicago Jazz and Then Some, about jazz pianist Jess Stacy, and with her husband, On Screen Acting.

Death
Porter died of natural causes in Canoga Park, California, on January 13, 2018, aged 95. She was survived by two daughters and a stepson.

Filmography

Bibliography

References

External links
 
 
 

1922 births
2018 deaths
Actresses from Texas
American film actresses
American television actresses
Metro-Goldwyn-Mayer contract players
20th-century American actresses
People from Cisco, Texas
21st-century American women